Western Tread Recordings was an independent record label based in Tempe, Arizona. It was owned and operated by Jim Adkins of Jimmy Eat World and music-promoter Charlie Levy.

History
While commiserating one evening over dinner over the lack of label representation in the Southwest, friends Jim Adkins of Jimmy Eat World and Charlie Levy, a well-connected music promoter, decided to start their own label. Their chief goal was to showcase Arizona's fledgling talents through a steady slate of CD, EP, vinyl, and 7-inch releases, and to focus on releasing Jimmy Eat World records on vinyl. Their first releases included EP by the Format, a vinyl version of Jimmy Eat World's Bleed American, and The Bull, the Balloon, and the Family by Reubens Accomplice.

Even though Western Tread expanded over time, it remained strictly a part-time venture for both Adkins and Levy.  This label now appears to be dormant.  While being interviewed by Matt Pryor of The Get Up Kids during his Nothing to Write Home About Podcast, Adkins stated that the label is not exactly dead, but, at this point, serves only as a catalog of music.

Bands 

 Dopamine
 The Format
 Jimmy Eat World
 Less Pain Forever
 Peachcake
 Reubens Accomplice
 Tickertape Parade

Discography

References

External links
 Western Tread MySpace (inactive)

American independent record labels
Indie rock record labels
Record labels based in Arizona